Oliver Cary (1752 - 1846) was an Irish Anglican priest.

Cary was born in County Roscommon and educated at Trinity College, Dublin. He was appointed  Archdeacon of Elphin in 1798.  He resigned in 1809 for the Prebendal Stall of Kilcooley in Elphin Cathedral.

References 

Archdeacons of Elphin
Alumni of Trinity College Dublin
People from County Roscommon
18th-century Irish Anglican priests
19th-century Irish Anglican priests
1846 deaths
1752 births